Damat Ali-Paša's Turbeh is an Ottoman mausoleum erected in 1784 in Belgrade, Serbia. It held the body of the vizier Silahdar Damat Ali Pasha. The building is situated in the Upper Town of the Belgrade Fortress. Along with Sheik Mustafa's Tomb, this monument represents one of the only remaining examples of Islamic funerary architecture in Belgrade.

History
The history of the turbeh is known from archival material from the Ottoman period, from rich eighteenth century cartographic material, and from a marble memorial plaque which was once mounted above the entrance. During World War I, the plaque was taken to Budapest. It was returned to Belgrade in 1958 as part of a process of restitution of cultural property. The plaque was kept for a time at the Belgrade Military Museum, before being returned to the turbeh. However, it did not fit the space that it was thought to have occupied above the portal of the turbeh. As a consequence, reviews of the historical sources and dating of the plaque and turbeh were undertaken.

The text on the plaque says that Damat Ali-Paša, a vizier (high ranking political officer) was buried by his muhurdar (keeper of the official seal). After the end of Austrian occupation with the Treaty of Belgrade (1739), the muhurdar returned to Belgrade as a defterdar (treasury official). From 1741  1742, he erected the turbeh at the previous burial site. This information on the plaque is confirmed by the Turkish archival material, which specifies that Damat Ali-Paša's turbeh was located next to the sultan Mehmed`s Mosque. The position of this mosque, as well as the position of the turbeh, was precisely detailed in several documents. Damat Ali-Paša died in 1716 and was buried in Belgrade. The important data for the location of the original position of Damat Ali-Paša's grave was the position of sultan Suleiman's mosque, erected soon after the first Turkish conquest of Belgrade in 1521, and in whose vicinity Damat Ali-Paša was buried. This mosque does not survive, and only traces are preserved. Based on the existing cartographic material, it is a reliable assumption that the mosque was located in the Upper Town of the Belgrade Fortress, 40–50m east from Mehmed Paša Sokolović's Fountain.

During the major Austrian reconstruction of the Belgrade Fortress in the period between 1718 and 1725, the levelling of the Lower Town took place and almost all structures from the earlier period were destroyed. The above-mentioned mosque was destroyed during these works, as well as the burial place of Damat Ali-Paša. After the return of the Turkish authorities to Belgrade, in 1740, they oversaw a comprehensive remodelling of the Upper Town of the Belgrade Fortress. The existing Austrian barracks were adapted for the new Imperial Mosque of Sultan Mahmud. The above-mentioned defterdar Mustafa, former muhurdar (the keeper of the seal) of Damat Ali-Paša, erected a turbeh at that time on the site of Damat Ali-Paša's burial place, east from the new mosque, in 1741–42. The traces of a five-metre wide hexagonal base of this construction were preserved which, according to the cartographic data, was covered with a calotte and six-arched roof. Along with these features, the plans show seven more turbehs of square base in the area around the mosque, probably designed in the form of an open canopy on the top of the graves with scopes.

One of the most important and valuable collection of documents for the dating and attribution of the turbeh are the plans from the Military Archive in Vienna (KAW sig. G I b 44–1 and sig. G I b 45), on which the turbeh in the central part of the Upper town in the Belgrade Fortress was marked as the "burial place of the Paša who died in 1784". According to Turkish archival sources, this was the year when great vizier Izzet Mehmed Pasha was buried in the Upper town of the Belgrade Fortress. The implication is that the turbeh in the Upper Town, which is still preserved today, was erected as the memorial to Izzet Mehmed Pasha. A text from 1818–1819, found in the turbeh, establishes that the Belgrade vizier of that time, Маršali-Paša, believed that he was renewing the desecrated grave and turbeh of Damat Ali-Paša. The same source states that the grave was desecrated when the Christians took over Belgrade. Two decades later, the vizier Selim-Paša was buried in this turbeh. Selim-Paša was appointed the Belgrade muhafiz (the commander of the city) in 1847, and died suddenly 41 days later. Thanks to the comprehensive legend from one of the Turkish plans from the mid-nineteenth century (the plan from the Archive of Serbia sig. GK 7), it is evident that this turbeh was also the burial place of Hasan-Paša. Probably, the legend refers to Hasan-Paša Češmeli, who was appointed the Belgrade muhafiz in 1848, and remained in that position until his death in 1850.

After the withdrawal of the Turkish army in 1867, the turbeh served as a storage building and then as a museum of old weapons and trophies. During the bombing of Belgrade in 1915, the portal and one part of the niche where the original inscription was located, were completely destroyed. Soon after that, in 1915, the Austrians began reconstructing the turbeh. The work on the final reconstruction were undertaken by the Municipality of Belgrade in the 1930s. In place of the old, broken plaque with the inscription, a new plaque was set in the niche above the portal. The plaque bears an inscription stating in both Serbian and in Arabic that the turbeh is the burial place of Damat Ali-Paša, the conqueror of the Peloponnese peninsula in southern Greece.

Description
The turbeh is a simple building with an hexagonal base and a shallow calotte on the top, which rests upon the drum. The structure was built from precisely-hewn stone blocks. The only decorative accents on the exterior are divided, profiled cornices and a profiled portal above which there was a niche which contained the original inscription. Opposite the entrance, on the southeast wall, there is a niche with an ornamented upper part. On the same part of the wall, there are small holes for the cressets, which flank the mentioned niche. On the remaining four walls there are windows. The entire building is seven metres tall. In the central part of the turbeh, there is a rectangular burial construction, whose dimensions are 2.20 m x 0.85 m x 145 m. Above this grave, there used to be Izzet Mehmed Pasha's  telescope, which has not been preserved. In the available photo-documentation, the building was shown with a six-arched roof covered with tiles. Considering that in an itinerary (Hans Kunic, 1673) dealing with the description of oriental Belgrade, it was stated that Turkish temples were covered with lead and that very often lead was used as the system of roofing of sacral and funerary structures, there is a possibility that the roof of Damat Ali-Paša's turbeh was realized in the same way. The shape of the turbeh conforms to the standard shape of the representative funerary structures of the Ottoman Empire. More modest forms of this type of mausoleum indicate the likelihood of a canopy resting on four or more columns. Although such forms of grave memorials were erected in the territory of Belgrade, unfortunately, none have been preserved. A polygonal or (more commonly) hexagonal structure was usual for the Ottoman funerary architecture and served for the burial of famous Turkish dignitaries.

The development of the Turkish architecture in the territory of Belgrade can best be observed in the area of Belgrade Fortress. In this area, however, it is rare to be able to assign architecture absolutely to a single historical period, given the widespread history of destruction and reconstruction. With short interludes, the time period which can be determined as Turkish dates from 1521 to 1867. There are few original examples of Ottoman architecture survive in the Belgrade Fortress, and those that do primarily comprise utilitarian, military architecture. One of the rare structures preserved in its original and authentic form is Damat Ali-Paša's turbeh. Damat Ali-Paša's turbeh represents a significant cultural and historical value as the material testimony of the historical development of the city of Belgrade and the architectural value as a rare and representative monument of Ottoman architecture in Belgrade.

Research and scholarship
Over the past hundred years, a number of scholarly research publications have appeared relating to Damat Ali-Paša's turbeh. A former clerk of the Turkish embassy in Belgrade, Теvdih Remzi, managed to restore the text of the damaged memorial plaque above the portal of the turbeh and identified the structure as the burial place of Hadži Mustafa Pasha, a Belgrade vizier, murdered in 1801. During his stay in Belgrade during the First World War, 1916–17, Remzi corrected this assertion, with a more precise rendering of the text from the plaque as: "With the effort of Hadži Mustafa Paša, Šehid Ali Paša's turbeh was repaired", thus identifying the turbeh as the memorial to the eminent Turkish commander Damat Ali-Paša. This identification challenged the widespread belief that the turbeh was the burial place of Kara Mustafa Pasha, who, in 1683, after the defeat near Vienna, was murdered in Belgrade by the order of sultan Mehmed IV. During research conducted in 1936–37, and following restoration works on the turbeh conducted by Меhmed Delić on the burial site in the turbeh, a broken scope was found with an inscription on it from 1818/19. The restored text from the scope proves that the structure was originally erected at the burial site of Damat Ali-Paša, and that it was rebuilt in 1818–1819. In a 1977 study of Ottoman architecture in Belgrade, Divan Đurić-Zamolo argued that the structure dated back to 1716–1717; and the architect I. Zdravković concurred with this view. The largest and most detailed study to date was published by Marko Popović in 1991, and demonstrates that the turbeh was erected in 1784 as the memorial to Izzet Mehmed Pasha.

References

Buildings and structures in Belgrade
Islamic architecture